A gelin (Turkish for bride) is a type of female ghost reportedly seen in slum areas and associated with some local legend of tragedy.  Common to many of them is the theme of losing or being betrayed by a husband or fiancé. They are often associated with an individual family line or said to be a harbinger of death, similar to a banshee. In Turkey, a gelin was the ghost of a girl or young woman that died violently, usually young women who committed suicide because they had been jilted by their lovers, or unmarried women who were pregnant.

References

External links
 Efsanevi Yaratıklar (Mythical Creatures) - Gelin
Özhan Öztürk. Folklor ve Mitoloji Sözlüğü 2 Ocak 2010; Ankara, 2009 Phoenix Yayınları. page 403 

Greek folklore
Greek legendary creatures
Middle Eastern legendary creatures
Turkish folklore
Turkic legendary creatures
Female legendary creatures
Banshees
Ghosts